The Potenza metropolitan railway service is a commuter rail system operated by Ferrovie Appulo Lucane. It serves the city of Potenza in the region of Basilicata, Italy.

History

The opening of the service took place on 1 November 2007  on a 950 mm narrow gauge line built in the 1930s from Potenza to Avigliano.

Future projects
Improvement of the service began in 2015, with projects including elimination of level crossings, increased frequency, modernisation of stations and the construction of a new terminus station Gallitello.

See also
 List of suburban and commuter rail systems

References

Passenger rail transport in Italy